Leontin Sălăjan (19 June 1913 – 28 August 1966) was a Romanian communist military and political leader.

Born in Santău Commune, Satu Mare County (then in Szilágy County, Austria-Hungary), he was of Hungarian ethnicity, a locksmith by training. In 1934, he was recruited into the military engineering branch of the Romanian Army, performing his military service in a broadcasting regiment. He joined the banned Romanian Communist Party in 1939, belonging to its Transylvanian faction and holding positions in its Banat structures. In 1948, following the establishment of a Communist regime, he became deputy Health Minister, followed by a stint in 1949-1950 as Constructions Minister. In 1950, despite his limited military experience, he was promoted to army general and named Chief of the Romanian General Staff, holding the office until 1954. He was made Armed Forces Minister in 1955, holding the position until his death. While in this office, he was a close ally of Nicolae Ceaușescu, alongside whom he sat on a high command during the Hungarian Revolution of 1956, charged with suppressing unrest by any means necessary, including ordering security forces to open fire.

Within the party, he was a member of the central committee from 1945, and with Ceaușescu's rise to general secretary in 1965, he first became alternate member of the politburo and then member of the executive committee. He died after a failed ulcer operation that resulted in much speculation. In May 1966, he had participated in a rancorous meeting in Moscow with Soviet Marshal Andrei Grechko, with the latter demanding increased Romanian military participation in the Warsaw Pact and the Romanian side, increasingly assertive of independence, hesitating to embrace the idea. As with the controversial death of Gheorghe Gheorghiu-Dej a year earlier, Sălăjan's end came after being operated upon by doctors at Elias Hospital. According to an anesthesiologist who was present, Ceaușescu appeared after a first operation, encouraging the doctors: "Comrades, do something heroic!"

Sălăjan was elected to the Assembly of Deputies for Sălaj County in 1946 and obtained a Sălăj seat in the Great National Assembly (MAN) in 1948, holding it until 1952. Later, he sat for Arad from 1952 to 1957 and for Oradea from 1957 until his death. In 1963, he was awarded the Order of the Star of the Romanian People's Republic, first class.

Notes

1913 births
1966 deaths
People from Satu Mare County
Romanian locksmiths
Romanian politicians of Hungarian descent
Romanian communists
Members of the Great National Assembly
Members of the Chamber of Deputies (Romania)
Romanian Land Forces generals
Chiefs of the General Staff of Romania
Romanian Ministers of Defence
Romanian Ministers of Public Works
Romanian Ministers of Transport
Recipients of the Order of the Star of the Romanian Socialist Republic